This article contains a list of productions made by Nickelodeon Animation Studio, which is a part of Nickelodeon Networks and owned by Paramount Global. This list includes animated television series, shorts, specials, and other projects.

Television series 
{| class="wikitable sortable"
|-
! #
! Title
! Creator(s) / Developer(s)
! Year(s)
! Co-production(s)
! Network
! Notes
|-
! colspan="7" style="background:#f46d25;"| 1990s
|-
| 1
| Doug || Jim Jinkins || 1991–1994 || Jumbo PicturesEllipse Programmé ||rowspan="2"| Nickelodeon || Seasons 1–4 only; Disney acquired the series in 1996 and produced three more seasons, which aired on ABC.
|-
| 2
| Rugrats || Arlene Klasky, Gábor Csupó, and Paul Germain || 1991–2004 || Klasky Csupo ||
|-
| 3
| The Ren & Stimpy Show || John Kricfalusi || 1991–1996 || Spümcø || Nickelodeon (1991–1995)MTV (1996)|| Oversaw the production of seasons 1–2, directly produced seasons 3–5 and credited as Games Animation Inc.
|-
| 4
| Rocko's Modern Life || Joe Murray || 1993–1996 || Joe Murray Productions ||rowspan="4"| Nickelodeon || Credited as Games Animation Inc.  
|-
| 5
| Aaahh!!! Real Monsters || Gábor Csupó and Peter Gaffney || 1994–1997 || Klasky Csupo || 
|-
| 6
| Hey Arnold! || Craig Bartlett || 1996–2004 || Snee-Oosh, Inc. || Credited as Games Animation Inc. for season 1.
|-
| 7
| The Angry Beavers || Mitch Schauer || 1997–2001 || Gunther-Wahl Productions, Inc. || 
|-
| 8
| CatDog || Peter Hannan || 1998–2005 || Peter Hannan Productions || Nickelodeon (1998–2001)Nicktoons (2004–2005)|| 
|-
| 9
| The Wild Thornberrys || Arlene Klasky, Gábor Csupó, Steve Pepoon, David Silverman, and Stephen Sustarsic || 1998–2004 || Klasky Csupo ||rowspan="3"| Nickelodeon ||
|-
| 10
| SpongeBob SquarePants || Stephen Hillenburg: Derek Drymon, Tim Hill, and Nick Jennings || 1999–present || United Plankton Pictures || 
|-
| 11
| Rocket Power || Arlene Klasky and Gábor Csupó || 1999–2004 || Klasky Csupo ||
|-
! colspan="7" style="background:#f46d25;"| 2000s
|-
| 12
| As Told by Ginger || Emily Kapnek || 2000–06  || Klasky Csupo || Nickelodeon (2000–04)Nicktoons (2004–06) ||
|-
| 13
| The Fairly OddParents || Butch Hartman || 2001–17 || Frederator IncorporatedBillionfold Inc. (seasons 6–10) || Nickelodeon (2001–16)Nicktoons (2017) || 
|-
| 14
| Invader Zim || Jhonen Vasquez || 2001–06 || || Nickelodeon (2001–02)Nicktoons (2006) || 
|-
| 15
| Action League Now! || Robert Mittenthal, Will McRobb, and Albie Hecht || 2001–02 || Flying Mallet, Inc.Chuckimation ||rowspan="4"| Nickelodeon || Spin-off of KaBlam!.
|-
| 16
| ChalkZone || Bill Burnett and Larry Huber || 2002–08 || Frederator Incorporated || 
|-
| 17
| The Adventures of Jimmy Neutron, Boy Genius || John A. Davis || 2002–06 || O EntertainmentDNA Productions || Follow-up to the film Jimmy Neutron: Boy Genius.
|-
| 18
| All Grown Up! || Arlene Klasky, Gábor Csupó, and Paul Germain || 2003–08 || Klasky Csupo || Spin-off of Rugrats.
|-
| 19
| My Life as a Teenage Robot || Rob Renzetti || 2003–09 || Frederator Incorporated || Nickelodeon (2003–05)Nicktoons (2008–09) || 
|-
| 20
| Danny Phantom || Butch Hartman: Steve Marmel || 2004–07 || Billionfold Inc. ||rowspan="4"| Nickelodeon || 
|-
| 21
| Avatar: The Last Airbender || Michael Dante DiMartino and Bryan Konietzko || 2005–08 || rowspan="3" | || 
|-
| 22
| Catscratch || Doug TenNapel || 2005–07 ||
|-
| 23
| The X's || Carlos Ramos || 2005–06 ||
|-
| 24
| El Tigre: The Adventures of Manny Rivera || Sandra Equihua and Jorge R. Gutierrez || 2007–08 || Mexopolis || Nickelodeon (2007–08)Nicktoons (2008) || 
|-
| 25
| Tak and the Power of Juju || Avalanche Entertainment : Jed Spingarn, Nick Jennings, and Mitch Watson || 2007–09 || THQ || Nickelodeon || Based on the video game series of the same name.
|-
| 26
| Back at the Barnyard || Steve Oedekerk || 2007–11 || Omation Animation Studio || Nickelodeon (2007–10)Nicktoons (2011) || Follow-up to the film Barnyard.
|-
| 27
| The Mighty B! || Amy Poehler, Cynthia True, and Erik Wiese || 2008–11 || Paper Kite ProductionsPolka Dot Pictures || Nickelodeon (2008–10)Nicktoons (2010–11) || 
|-
| 28
| Making Fiends || Amy Winfrey || 2008 || || Nicktoons || Based on the web series of the same name.
|-
| 29
| The Penguins of Madagascar || Tom McGrath and Eric Darnell : Mark McCorkle and Bob Schooley || 2008–15 || DreamWorks Animation || Nickelodeon (2008–12)Nicktoons (2013–15) || 
|-
| 30
| Fanboy & Chum Chum || Eric Robles || 2009–14 || Frederator Studios || Nickelodeon (2009–12)Nicktoons (2014) || 
|-
! colspan="7" style="background:#f46d25;"| 2010s
|-
| 31
| Planet Sheen || Keith Alcorn and Steve Oedekerk || 2010–13 || O EntertainmentOmation Animation Studio || Nickelodeon (2010–11)Nicktoons (2012–13) || Spin-off of The Adventures of Jimmy Neutron, Boy Genius.
|-
| 32
| T.U.F.F. Puppy || Butch Hartman || 2010–15 || Billionfold Inc.  || Nickelodeon (2010–13)Nicktoons (2013–15) || 
|-
| 33
| Winx Club (revival) || Iginio Straffi || 2011–16 || Rainbow S.p.A.  || Nickelodeon (2011–14)Nick Jr. (2014–16) || Seasons 5–7 and four specials were co-produced in-house at Nick Animation.
|-
| 34
| Kung Fu Panda: Legends of Awesomeness || Ethan Reiff and Cyrus Voris : Peter Hastings || 2011–16 || DreamWorks Animation || Nickelodeon (2011–14)Nicktoons (2016) || 
|-
| 35
| The Legend of Korra || Bryan Konietzko and Michael Dante DiMartino || 2012–14  || Ginormous Madman Productions || Nickelodeon (2012–14)Nick.com (2014) || Sequel to Avatar: The Last Airbender.
|-
| 36
| Robot and Monster || Dave Pressler, Joshua Sternin, and J.R. Ventimilia || 2012–15 || Smasho! ProductionsLowbar Productions || Nickelodeon (2012)Nicktoons (2013–15) ||
|-
| 37
| Teenage Mutant Ninja Turtles (reboot) || Kevin Eastman and Peter Laird : Ciro Nieli, Joshua Sternin, and J.R. Ventimilia || 2012–17 || Lowbar Productions || Nickelodeon (2012–17)Nicktoons (2017) || Reboot of the original 1987 animated series.
|-
| 38
| Monsters vs. Aliens || Conrad Vernon and Rob Letterman : Mark McCorkle, Bob Schooley and Bret Haaland || 2013–14 || DreamWorks Animation || rowspan="2" | Nickelodeon || 
|-
| 39
| Sanjay and Craig || Jim Dirschberger, Jay Howell, and Andreas Trolf || 2013–16 || Forest City Rockers || 
|-
| 40
| Breadwinners || Steve Borst and Gary "Doodles" DiRaffaele || 2014–16 || rowspan="4" | || Nickelodeon (2014–15)Nicktoons (2016) || 
|-
| 41
| Harvey Beaks || C. H. Greenblatt || 2015–17 || Nickelodeon (2015–16)Nicktoons (2017) ||
|-
| 42
| Pig Goat Banana Cricket || Dave Cooper and Johnny Ryan || 2015–18 || Nickelodeon (2015–16)Nicktoons (2016–18) || 
|-
| 43
| The Loud House || Chris Savino || 2016–present || Nickelodeon || 
|-
| 44
| Bunsen Is a Beast || Butch Hartman || 2017–18 || Billionfold Inc. || Nickelodeon (2017)Nicktoons (2017–18) || 
|-
| 45
| Welcome to the Wayne || Billy Lopez || 2017–19 || Yowza! Animation  || Nickelodeon (2017)Nicktoons (2018–19) || Based on the web series of the same name.Produced by the New York studio
|-
| 46
| The Adventures of Kid Danger || Dan Schneider || 2018 || Powerhouse Animation StudiosSchneider's Bakery || Nickelodeon || Animated spin-off of Henry Danger.
|-
| 47
| Rise of the Teenage Mutant Ninja Turtles || Kevin Eastman and Peter Laird : Andy Suriano and Ant Ward || 2018–20 || rowspan="2" | || Nickelodeon (2018–19)Nicktoons (2019–20) || Second reboot of the original 1987 animated series.
|-
| 48
| Pinky Malinky || Chris Garbutt and Rikke Asbjoern || rowspan="2"| 2019 || Netflix || Originated as a Cartoon Network-rejected pilot. Originally planned to air on Nickelodeon, it was later released on Netflix.
|-
| 49
| Middle School Moguls || Gina Heitkamp and Jenae Heitkamp || Gengirl Media, Inc. ||rowspan="2"| Nickelodeon || Miniseries.
|-
| 50
| The Casagrandes || Chris Savino and Miguel Puga : Michael Rubiner || 2019–2022 || || Spin-off of The Loud House.
|-
! colspan="7" style="background:#f46d25;"| 2020s
|-
| 51
| It's Pony || Ant Blades || 2020–present || Blue Zoo Animation Studio|| Nickelodeon (2020)Nicktoons (2021–present) || 
|-
| 52
| Glitch Techs || Eric Robles and Dan Milano || 2020 || || Netflix || Originally planned to air on Nickelodeon, it was later released on Netflix.
|-
| 53
| Kamp Koral: SpongeBob's Under Years || Stephen Hillenburg : Vincent Waller, Marc Ceccarelli, Mr. Lawrence, Kaz, Luke Brookshier and Andrew Goodman || rowspan="5"| 2021–present || United Plankton Pictures || rowspan="2"| Paramount+ || Spin-off of SpongeBob SquarePants. Released on Paramount+ and later on Nickelodeon.
|-
| 54
| Rugrats (reboot) || Arlene Klasky, Gábor Csupó and Paul Germain  || Klasky Csupo || Reboot of the original 1991 animated series. Released on Paramount+ and later on Nickelodeon.
|-
| 55
| The Patrick Star Show || Stephen Hillenburg : Luke Brookshier, Marc Ceccarelli, Andrew Goodman, Kaz, Mr. Lawrence and Vincent Waller || United Plankton Pictures || rowspan="2" | Nickelodeon || Second spin-off of SpongeBob SquarePants.
|-
| 56
| Middlemost Post || John Trabbic III || || 
|-
| 57
| Star Trek: Prodigy || Gene Roddenberry Dan Hageman and Kevin Hageman || Secret HideoutRoddenberry EntertainmentBrothers Hageman ProductionsCBS Eye Animation ProductionsCBS Studios || rowspan="2"| Paramount+Nickelodeon || Based on the Star Trek franchise. Released on Paramount+ and later on Nickelodeon.
|-
| 58
| Big Nate ||  Lincoln Peirce : Mitch Watson || rowspan="3" | 2022–present || John Cohen Productions || Based on the comic strip series of the same name. Released on Paramount+ and later on Nickelodeon.
|-
| 59
| Monster High || Garrett Sander : Shea Fontana || Mattel Television || Nickelodeon || Based on the toyline of the same.
|-
| 60
| Transformers: EarthSpark|| Hasbro : Dale Malinowski, Ant Ward and Nicole Dubuc || Entertainment One || Paramount+Nickelodeon || Based on the toyline of the same name.
|-
! colspan="7" style="background:#f46d25;" | Upcoming
|-
| 61
| Max & the Midknights|| Lincoln Pierce  || rowspan="3"  | 2023 || rowspan="2" | || rowspan="7" | Nickelodeon || Based on the children's book series of the same name.
|-
| 62
| Rock, Paper, Scissors || Kyle Stegina and Josh Lehrman || 
|-
| 63
| Zokie of Planet Ruby || Laurie ElliotMike GeigerBrian Morante || Nelvana || 
|-
| 64
| Garfield || Jim Davis  || rowspan="6"  || Paws, Inc. || Based on the comic strip series of the same name.
|-
| 65
| Adventures in Wonder Park || Robert Gordon, Josh Applebaum, and André Nemec : David Zuckerman and Anne Flett-Giordano || Paramount AnimationSkydance Animation Madrid || Follow-up to the film Wonder Park.
|-
| 66
| Real Pigeons Fight Crime || Andrew McDonald, Ben Wood : James Corden and Ben Winston || Fulwell 73 || Based on the children's book of the same name.
|}

 Anthology series 

 Nick Jr. shows 

 Other Paramount networks 

 Digital short series 

 Short pilots 

 Nickelodeon (greenlit to series) 

 Nickelodeon (not greenlit to series) 

 Produced for other Paramount-owned networks 

 TV movies and specials 

 Broadcast releases 

 Digital releases 

 Direct-to-video 
All the films (except the international release of Charlotte's Web 2: Wilbur's Great Adventure'') were distributed to home video by Paramount Home Entertainment.

Theatrical films 
All the films are distributed by Paramount Pictures.

Notes

References 

Nickelodeon Animation Studio
Lists of animated television series
Nickelodeon-related lists
Paramount Global-related lists